Julie Fitzgerald  is a veteran Australian netball coach. Between 1997 and 2007, Fitzgerald served as head coach of Sydney Swifts in the Commonwealth Bank Trophy league. She guided Swifts to premierships in 2001, 2004, 2006 and 2007. Between 2008 and 2011, she served as head coach of New South Wales Swifts in the ANZ Championship. In 2008, she guided Swifts to the inaugural ANZ Championship title. Between 2014 and 2016, she guided Waikato Bay of Plenty Magic to the Finals Series every year in the ANZ Championship. Since 2017, Fitzgerald has served as head coach of Giants Netball in Suncorp Super Netball, guiding them to two grand finals and two minor championships. In 2020, Fitzgerald was made a Member of the Order of Australia.

Early life and family
Fitzgerald is originally from Sydney, growing up in Hornsby Shire. She started playing netball in Hornsby Heights when she was about eight years old. She is a single parent to four children – Katie, Kristie, Vicky and John – and is a resident of Wahroonga.

Head coach

New South Wales
Between 1985 and 1999, Fitzgerald served as head coach of various New South Wales teams that played in the Australian National Netball Championships at under-19, under-21  and open levels.

Sydney Ku-ring-gai/Cenovis
At state league level, Fitzgerald served as head coach of a team that represented the Ku-ring-gai area. She had previously coached several junior representative teams for the Ku-ring-gai Netball Association. Between 1994 and 1996, Fitzgerald served as head coach of the Sydney Ku-ring-gai/Cenovis team in the Mobil Superleague. The team featured a young Liz Ellis and Catherine Cox. In 1994 and 1996 they were Mobil Superleague semi-finalists.

Sydney Swifts
Between 1997 and 2007, Fitzgerald served as head coach of Sydney Swifts in the Commonwealth Bank Trophy league. With teams featuring Liz Ellis, Catherine Cox and Megan Anderson, she guided Swifts to premierships in 2001, 2004, 2006 and 2007. In 2004, 2006 and 2007 she was name Netball Australia Coach of the Year.

New South Wales Swifts
Between 2008 and 2011, Fitzgerald served as head coach of New South Wales Swifts in the ANZ Championship. In 2008 she guided Swifts to the premiership and was named Australian ANZ Championship Coach of the Year. On 18 May 2009, she took charge of her 200th combined Sydney Swifts/NSW Swifts match when Swifts played Queensland Firebirds in Round 7. In 2010 she guided Swifts to the minor premiership. 2011 was the last season that Fitzgerald served as Swifts' head coach. Following a controversial  "internal review" conducted during the 2011 season by Netball New South Wales , she was replaced by Lisa Beehag.

World 7
In August 2009, Fitzgerald served as head coach of a World 7 team that defeated New Zealand 2–1 in an international test series. Lisa Alexander served as Fitzgerald's assistant during the series. As winners of the series, the World 7 team were awarded the Taini Jamison Trophy.

Australian Institute of Sport
Between 2011 and 2013, Fitzgerald served as head netball coach at the Australian Institute of Sport. In 2012 she guided an AIS team to fourth in the Australian Netball League.

Waikato Bay of Plenty Magic
In July 2013, Fitzgerald was appointed head coach of Waikato Bay of Plenty Magic. Between 2014 and 2016, she guided Magic to the Finals Series every year in the ANZ Championship. While Magic head coach, she was also named head coach of the 2014 ANZ Championship All Star Team. In both 2015 and 2016, Fitzgerald guided Magic to the New Zealand Conference titles.
On 27 June 2016, at a 2016 Round 13 match against Queensland Firebirds, Fitzgerald coached her 100th ANZ Championship match.

Giants Netball
In August 2016, Fitzgerald was announced as head coach of Netball New South Wales's new franchise. Since 2017, Fitzgerald has served as head coach of Giants Netball in Suncorp Super Netball. In 2017 she guided them to the grand final. In 2018 she guided Giants to the minor premiership. During the 2018 season Fitzgerald also coached her 300th senior league match. In 2020, Fitzgerald was made a Member of the Order of Australia. In 2021, Fitzgerald guided Giants to  both a second minor premiership and a second grand final. During the season she coached her 350th senior league match. The grand final was her 360th in charge.

Assistant coach

Australia
Fitzgerald has worked with the Australia national netball team as both an assistant and development coach. In 2006 Fitzgerald served as an assistant to Lisa Alexander with the Australia under-21 team. Between 2011 and 2013 she served as Alexander's assistant at various series and tournaments including the 2011 World Netball Series and  2012 Fast5 Netball World Series. In 2019 Fitzgerald was appointed as head coach of Netball Australia's athlete development program. In 2021 she was re-appointed to the role.

NSWIS
In July 2017, alongside Rob Wright, Fitzgerald served as an assistant coach to Briony Akle as she coached the New South Wales Institute of Sport team that finished third in the 2017 Netball New Zealand Super Club tournament. The NSWIS team was a composite team featuring players from both New South Wales Swifts and Giants Netball.

Basketball
As well as being a netball coach, Fitzgerald has also been a local basketball administrator. Between 1996 and 2007 she worked as a general manager for the Hornsby Ku-ring-gai Basketball Association. During the mid‑1990s she helped establish Hornsby Spiders Basketball Club.

Honours

Coach
Giants Netball
Suncorp Super Netball
Runners up: 2017, 2021 
Minor Premiership: 2018, 2021
Waikato Bay of Plenty Magic
ANZ Championship – New Zealand Conference
Winners: 2015, 2016
New South Wales Swifts
ANZ Championship
Winners: 2008
Minor Premiership: 2010
World 7
Taini Jamison Trophy
Winners: 2009
Sydney Swifts
Commonwealth Bank Trophy
Winners: 2001, 2004, 2006, 2007
Runners up: 1998, 2003, 2005

Individual awards

References

Living people
Year of birth missing (living people)
Australian netball coaches
Australian netball players
Netball players from Sydney
Sydney Swifts
Esso/Mobil Superleague coaches
Commonwealth Bank Trophy coaches
ANZ Championship coaches
Australian Netball League coaches
Suncorp Super Netball coaches
New South Wales Swifts coaches
Australian Institute of Sport netball coaches
Waikato Bay of Plenty Magic coaches
New South Wales Institute of Sport coaches
Australian expatriate netball people in New Zealand
Members of the Order of Australia
Basketball people in Australia